The Indian Hemp Decree (or the Indian Hemp Act) was enacted in Nigeria on 31 March 1966 by Major General Aguiyi Ironsi. The act was preceded by the Dangerous Drug Ordinance of 1935, which restricted opium and other drugs.

References

External links
Text of the Act at LawNigeria.com

1966 in cannabis
Cannabis in Nigeria
Cannabis law